The men's 50 metres hurdles event at the 1968 European Indoor Games was held on 10 March in Madrid.

Medalists

Results

Heats
First 4 from each heat (Q) qualified directly for the semifinals.

Semifinals
First 3 from each heat (Q) qualified directly for the final.

Final

References

60 metres hurdles at the European Athletics Indoor Championships
50